Pavlo Ivanovych Muravskyi (30 July 1914 – 6 October 2014) was a Ukrainian band-master and educator. His titles included Hero of Ukraine and People's Artist of the Ukrainian SSR.

Life and career 
Pavlo Muravskyi was born in 1914 in Dmytrashkivka village. In 1941 he graduated from the Ukrainian National Academy of Music named after Tchaikovsky. He was a band-master at  "Dumka" cappella from 1940 to 1941 as well as from 1946 to 1948. During 1949-1955 he taught at Lviv Conservatory and again continued his professional activity at the "Dumka" cappella during 1964-1969. He died in Kyiv on October 6, 2014, and was buried in the Baikove cemetery.

The 95th anniversary of Muravskyi's birth and the 75th anniversary of his creative and pedagogical activity were held in December 2009.

Awards 
 Hero of Ukraine (March 23, 2009);
 People's Artist of the Ukrainian SSR (1960); 
 Honorary title of the President of Ukraine (September 20, 1994);
 The second-degree order for Services (December 22, 1999);
 The first-degree order for Services (July 30, 2004);
 Order of the Red Star; 
 Order of the Patriotic War;
 Medal "For the Victory over Germany in the Great Patriotic War 1941–1945";
 Medal "In Commemoration of the 1500th Anniversary of Kyiv";

References 

1914 births
2014 deaths
Ukrainian music educators
People from Vinnytsia Oblast
Soviet musicians
Recipients of the Order of Bohdan Khmelnytsky, 3rd class